Adelheid "Heidi" Robbiani (born 27 October 1950) is a Swiss equestrian and Olympic medalist. She competed in show jumping at the 1984 Summer Olympics in Los Angeles, where she won a bronze medal in the individual contest, and placed fifth with the Swiss team, on the Irish Sport Horse chestnut mare Jessica V.

References

External links

1950 births
Living people
Swiss female equestrians
Olympic equestrians of Switzerland
Olympic bronze medalists for Switzerland
Equestrians at the 1984 Summer Olympics
Olympic medalists in equestrian
Medalists at the 1984 Summer Olympics